Douglasocaris is a genus of bivalved arthropod from the Middle Ordovician (Darriwilian, 460 million years old) Douglas Lake Member of the Lenoir Limestone from Douglas Dam Tennessee.

Description
Douglasocaris has alternatively been considered a phyllocarid or a notostracan.

References

Fossils of Tennessee
Prehistoric arthropod genera